The 1978 All-East football team consists of American football players chosen by various selectors as the best players at each position among the Eastern colleges and universities during the 1978 NCAA Division I-A football season.

Offense

Quarterback
 Chuck Fusina, Penn State (UPI-1)

Running backs
 Joe Holland, Cornell (UPI-1)
 Matt Suhey, Penn State (UPI-1)
 Jeff Dufresne, Dartmouth (UPI-1)

Tight end
 John Spagnola, Yale (UPI-1)

Wide receivers
 Gordon Jones, Pitt (UPI-1)

Tackles
 Keith Dorney, Penn State (UPI-1)
 John Gallo, Rutgers (UPI-1)

Guards
 Matt Carroll, Pitt (UPI-1)
 Bob Brewer, Temple (UPI-1)

Center
 Chuck Johnston, Army (UPI-1)

Placekicker
 Matt Bahr, Penn State (UPI-1)

Defense

Ends
 Hugh Green, Pitt (UPI-1)
 Clint Streit, Yale (UPI-1)

Tackles
 Bruce Clark, Penn State (UPI-1)
 Matt Millen, Penn State (UPI-1)

Middle guard
 Pete Funke, Princeton (UPI-1)

Linebackers
 Bill Crowley, Yale (UPI-1)
 Al Chesley, Pitt (UPI-1)
 Tom Kuchar, Dartmouth (UPI-1)

Defensive backs 
 Jeff Delaney, Pitt (UPI-1)
 Pete Harris, Penn State (UPI-1)
 Gregg Milo, Navy (UPI-1)

Key
 AP = Associated Press
 UPI = United Press International

See also
 1978 College Football All-America Team

References

All-Eastern
All-Eastern college football teams